Serge Souchon-Koguia (born 12 October 1987) is a Central African Republican footballer who plays as a midfielder. He has represented the Central African Republic on two occasions, both in 2011.

Career
Souchon-Koguia signed for Étoile FC in 2010. He made his debut during the 2010 S.League season against Albirex Niigata (S) in a 0–0 draw.

In 2012, he move to Tanjong Pagar United after Étoile FC withdrew from the S.League citing youth commitment reasons.

Controversy
Souchon-Koguia was involved in the controversial match for Étoile FC against Hougang United which was called off before kick-off when an all in brawl erupted during the pre-match warm up. Details of the fracas are sketchy, however it is believed the fight started when Souchon-Koguia's team-mate, Hadama Bathily entered the Hougang's warm up area to retrieve a miss-kicked ball. Bathily then attacked Hougang's assistant coach Hasrin Jailani after it was claimed by Bathili that he was racially abused by Jailani. Both teams then rushed to defend their respective team members where the fight escalated.

The Football Association of Singapore set up a disciplinary committee to investigate and punish the individuals responsible for causing the melee. Both clubs received $10,000 in fines, of which $5,000 was suspended until the end of season. Three Hougang members, including the assistant coach received fines and suspensions. Souchon-Koguia himself, received a five-match ban, and a $1,500-dollar fine for committing an assault on Hougang player Basit Abdul Hamid.

International career
In 2011, Souchon-Koguia was called up to the Central African Republic national football team for a friendly against Malta on 11 August 2011. He played the full 90 minutes, in which Malta ran out 2–1 winners.

Souchon-Koguia was called up for a second time, by CAR manager Jules Accorsi, this time for a crucial 2012 African Cup of Nations qualification match against Morocco. The Central African Republic, who at the time were tied with Morocco on first, needed to win the game in order to progress through to the 2012 African Cup of Nations, however a 0–0 draw would see them finish 2nd in the group, after losing to Algeria in the next match, in which he was not called up for.

References

External links
 
 
 

1987 births
Living people
Association football midfielders
Central African Republic footballers
Central African Republic international footballers
French footballers
Expatriate footballers in Singapore
Expatriate footballers in France
Ligue 2 players
Central African Republic emigrants to France
Tanjong Pagar United FC players
Toulouse Fontaines Club players
Étoile FC players